The 1976 Virginia Slims of Washington  was a women's tennis tournament played on indoor carpet courts at the GWU Smith Center & Capital Center in Washington D.C., in the United States that was part of the 1976 Virginia Slims World Championship Series. It was the fifth edition of the tournament and was held from January 18 through January 25, 1976. First-seeded Chris Evert won the singles title and earned $15,000 first-prize money.

Finals

Singles
 Chris Evert defeated  Virginia Wade 6–2, 6–1

Doubles
 Olga Morozova /  Virginia Wade defeated  Wendy Overton /  Mona Guerrant 7–6, 6–2

Prize money

References

External links
 Women's Tennis Association (WTA) tournament details

Virginia Slims of Washington
Virginia Slims of Washington
1976 in sports in Washington, D.C.
Virgin